William Cochrane is the name of:

William Cochrane (MP) (died 1717), Scottish MP
William Arthur Cochrane (1926–2017), Canadian physician, pediatrician, academic, and medical executive
William Avery Cochrane (1842–1929), American politician, soldier and teacher
William Cochrane, 1st Earl of Dundonald (1605–1685), Earl of Dundonald
William Cochrane, 3rd Earl of Dundonald, Earl of Dundonald
William Cochrane, 5th Earl of Dundonald, Earl of Dundonald
William Cochrane, 7th Earl of Dundonald, Earl of Dundonald
William Cochrane, Lord Cochrane from Alexander Montgomerie, 9th Earl of Eglinton
William J. Cochrane (1873–1940), British surveyor and philatelist who signed the Roll of Distinguished Philatelists in 1923

See also
William Cochran (disambiguation)